Mohammadreza Kheirollahzadeh (born 20 January 1993), also known as Mohammad Reza Kheirollahzadeh, is an Iranian Paralympic judoka. At the 2020 Summer Paralympics, he won gold in the Men's +100 kg event.

References

External links
 

1993 births
Living people
Iranian male judoka
Paralympic judoka of Iran
Paralympic gold medalists for Iran
Paralympic medalists in judo
Judoka at the 2020 Summer Paralympics
Medalists at the 2020 Summer Paralympics
21st-century Iranian people